In 2010, the GCC Volleyball Club Championship was staged in Oman. The championship was won by the Al Arabi Qatar team.

League standings

Source: koora.com (Arabic)

References

GCC Volleyball Club Championship